Kristen Shaldybin (born August 8, 1997) is an American group rhythmic gymnast. She represented the United States at the 2015 World Rhythmic Gymnastics Championships. As part of the American group rhythmic gymnastics team, she won a gold and two silver medals at the 2015 Pan American Games and competed at the 2016 Summer Olympics.

References

1997 births
Living people
American rhythmic gymnasts
Place of birth missing (living people)
Gymnasts at the 2015 Pan American Games
Pan American Games gold medalists for the United States
Pan American Games silver medalists for the United States
Pan American Games medalists in gymnastics
Medalists at the 2015 Pan American Games
21st-century American women